Aclytia superbior is a moth of the family Erebidae. It was described by Strand.

References

Aclytia